The following people share this Ossetian surname:

 Alan Dzutsev (footballer born 1988) (b. 1988), Ukrainian footballer
 Alan Dzutsev (footballer born 1991) (b. 1991), Russian footballer
 Konstantin Dzutsev (b. 1970), Russian former footballer and manager 
 Ruslan Dzutsev (b. 1984), Russian former footballer